Sir George William Elliot, 2nd Baronet (13 May 1844 – 15 November 1895) was an English colliery owner and Conservative politician who sat in the House of Commons in two periods between 1874 and 1895.

Elliot was born at Houghton-le-Spring, the son of Sir George Elliot, 1st Baronet and his wife Margaret Green, daughter of George Green. His father had been MP for North Durham.  Elliot was educated at Edinburgh and at Trinity College, Cambridge. He was an athletics blue in 1865 and 1866. He was the owner of a colliery.
 
At the 1874 general election Elliot was elected Member of Parliament for Northallerton. He held the seat until 1885. In 1886, he was elected MP for Richmond and held the seat until 1895.  He succeeded to the Baronetcy on the death of his father in 1893.
  
Elliot was master of the Bedale Hunt from 1884 to 1888, a Deputy Lieutenant for Monmouth and a J.P. He died at Folkestone at the age of 51 .

Elliot married Sarah Taylor, daughter of Charles Taylor a colliery owner of Sunderland in 1866.

References

External links
 

1844 births
1895 deaths
Deputy Lieutenants of Monmouthshire
Alumni of Trinity College, Cambridge
Baronets in the Baronetage of the United Kingdom
Conservative Party (UK) MPs for English constituencies
UK MPs 1880–1885
UK MPs 1874–1880
UK MPs 1886–1892
UK MPs 1892–1895